Ajob Premer Golpo is a 2021 Indian Bengali-language romantic drama film which is directed by Raja Chanda and produced by Shyamsundar Dey, Arijit Dutta. The film is starring Bonny Sengupta and Srabanti Chatterjee.

Cast
 Bonny Sengupta
 Srabanti Chatterjee
Pallavi Chatterjee
Sourav Chakraborty
Nabanita Mazumder
Ankita Majhi
Madhurima Basak
Alokananda Roy
Arindam Ganguly 
 Tonni Laha Roy

References

External links
 

2020s Bengali-language films
Bengali-language Indian films
2021 films
2021 romance films
Indian romance films
Films directed by Raja Chanda